Kasongo Lunda is a territory in the Democratic Republic of Congo, located in Kwango Province. The capital lies at Kasongo Lunda. It is the second biggest territory in Congo, located near to the border with Angola.

Politics

The traditional title for a local ruler was kiamfu or kyambvu. During the colonization of Congo in the 1940s, the Kiamfu's  represented the political opposition and resistance against Europeans. The heads of the political hierarchy and apparatus of the Kasongo-Lunda have been often forced to flee the area, mainly to the territories of today's Angola.

The territory is divided into Chiefdoms and Sectors:
Kasa Chiefdom 
Kasongo-Lunda Chiefdom
Kibunda Sector
Kingulu Sector
Kizamba Sector 
Mawanga Sector
Panzi Sector
Swa Tenda Sector

Economy

Kasongo Lunda has a number of development problems: the road infrastructure is in a bad condition, because of permanent erosion, the lack of money and political will to change the situation. Another major problem is the shortage of drinking water, and electricity. 
As for education, Kasongo Lunda has a good reputation with the famous jesuit N'temo college, which offers secondary education to about 430 students.

List of rulers of Kasongo-Lunda

Notes

References 
Willame, Jean-Claude: Patriarchal Structures and Factional Politics. Toward an Understanding of the Dualist Society Cahiers d'études africaines, Vol. 13, No. 50, pp. 326-355. (1973).

Kasongo Luunda (Yaka)
Territories of Kwango Province